La Roche-sur-le-Buis (literally La Roche on the Buis) is a commune in the Drôme department in southeastern France.

Population

See also
Communes of the Drôme department

References

Communes of Drôme